Attorney General Schmidt may refer to:

Derek Schmidt (born 1968), Attorney General of Kansas
Grant Schmidt (born 1948), Attorney General of Saskatchewan

See also
Eric Schmitt (born 1975), Attorney General of Missouri
General Schmidt (disambiguation)